Healy Park (known as O'Neills Healy Park for sponsorship reasons) is a GAA stadium in Omagh, County Tyrone, Northern Ireland and is named after a GAA clubman from Omagh, Michael Healy. 

Healy Park is the home ground of Omagh St. Enda's and the Tyrone county football team.

The stadium is located on the Gortin Road and approximately a 10-minute walk from the town centre, it is one of the largest stadiums in Northern Ireland with a ticketed capacity of approximately 17,636.

According to Hogan Stand, the stadium "is now recognised as one of the premier GAA venues in the country".

History

In early 1962, Omagh St. Enda's club purchased  of land at Lisnelly located near the Gortin Road. By 1968 the club had raised enough money to start construction of the new stadium. The park was eventually opened on 17 September 1972, by former GAA president Alf Murray and on 19 October 1980, the new park was dedicated to Michael Healy. The two years between 1980 and 1982 saw the fruition of the new clubrooms and social centre at Healy Park, which added further to the infrastructure of Healy Park. 1994 saw the terracing added to three sides of the pitch.

Work began in September 2001 to build a new all-seated covered stand with a capacity of 5,000. The stand was opened in 2004.

In April 2006, Healy Park became the first Gaelic football stadium in Ulster to have floodlighting installed.

A modern Press Box and Control Tower was made available at Healy Park for the Tyrone Senior Football Championship final on Sunday 14 October 2007 between Dromore St. Dympna's and Coalisland Na Fianna. New changing rooms and disabled facilities have also been installed.

In 2006, Tyrone GAA unveiled plans for a second covered stand at Healy Park as the board felt it was time for additional covered and seated accommodation. They also planned to expand the ends behind both goals. Work started on the second phase of the £5m redevelopment scheme.

See also
 List of Gaelic Athletic Association stadiums
 List of stadiums in Ireland

References

1972 establishments in Ireland
Gaelic games grounds in Northern Ireland
Omagh
Sports venues completed in 1972
Sports venues in County Tyrone
Tourist attractions in County Tyrone
Tyrone GAA